The invariant decomposition is a decomposition of the elements of  groups into orthogonal commuting elements. It is also valid in their subgroups, e.g. orthogonal, pseudo-Euclidean, conformal, and classical groups. Because the elements of Pin groups are the composition of  oriented reflections, the invariant decomposition theorem readsEvery -reflection can be decomposed into  commuting factors.
It is named the invariant decomposition because these factors are the invariants of the -reflection . A well known special case is the Chasles' theorem, which states that any rigid body motion in  can be decomposed into a rotation around, followed or preceded by a translation along, a single line. Both the rotation and the translation leave two lines invariant: the axis of rotation and the orthogonal axis of translation. Since both rotations and translations are bireflections, a more abstract statement of the theorem reads "Every quadreflection can be decomposed into commuting bireflections". In this form the statement is also valid for e.g. the spacetime algebra , where any Lorentz transformation can be decomposed into a commuting rotation and boost.

Bivector decomposition 
Any bivector  in the geometric algebra  of total dimension  can be decomposed into  orthogonal commuting simple bivectors that satisfy

The  are then found as solutions to the characteristic polynomial

Defining

This closed form solution for the invariant decomposition is only valid for eigenvalues  with algebraic multiplicity of 1. For degenerate  the invariant decomposition still exists, but cannot be found using the closed form solution.

Exponential map 
A -reflection  can be written as  where  is a bivector, and thus permits a factorization

The invariant decomposition therefore gives a closed form formula for exponentials, since each  squares to a scalar and thus follows Euler's formula:

Carefully evaluating the limit  gives

and thus translations are also included.

Rotor factorization 
Given a -reflection  we would like to find the factorization into . Defining the simple bivector

where . These bivectors can be found directly using the above solution for bivectors by substituting

After the bivectors  have been found,  is found straightforwardly as

Principal logarithm 
After the decomposition of  into  has been found, the principal logarithm of each simple rotor is given by

General Pin group elements 
To extend the invariant decomposition to a -reflections , we use that the vector part  is a reflection which already commutes with, and is orthogonal to, the -reflection . The problem then reduces to finding the decomposition of  using the method described above.

Invariant bivectors 
The bivectors  are invariants of the corresponding  since they commute with it, and thus under group conjugation

While the entire space undergoes a screw motion, these two axes remain unchanged by it.

History 
The invariant decomposition finds its roots in a statement made by Marcel Riesz about bivectors:Can any bivector  be decomposed into the direct sum of mutually orthogonal simple bivectors?Mathematically, this would mean that for a given bivector  in an  dimensional geometric algebra, it should be possible to find a maximum of  bivectors , such that , where the  satisfy   and should square to a scalar . Marcel Riesz gave some examples which lead to this conjecture, but also one (seeming) counter example. A first more general solution to the conjecture in geometric algebras  was given by David Hestenes and Garret Sobczyck. However, this solution was limited to purely Euclidean spaces. Also in 2011, Charles Gunn was the first to give a solution in the degenerate metric . This offered a first glimpse that the principle might be metric independent. Then, in 2021, the full metric and dimension independent closed form solution was given by Martin Roelfs in his PhD thesis. And because bivectors in a geometric algebra  form the Lie algebra , the thesis was also the first to use this to decompose elements of  groups into orthogonal commuting factors which each follow Euler's formula, and to present closed form exponential and logarithmic functions for these groups.

References 

Group theory